Moondog Matinee is the fifth studio album by Canadian/American rock group the Band, released in 1973. It consists entirely of cover material reflecting the group's love of R&B and blues music, with one exception in their interpretation of the theme from the film The Third Man.

In a 2002 interview, Levon Helm described the reasoning for recording an album of covers: "That was all we could do at the time. We couldn't get along—we all knew that fairness was a bunch of shit. We all knew we were getting screwed, so we couldn't sit down and create no more music. 'Up on Cripple Creek' and all that stuff was over—all that collaboration was over, and that type of song was all we could do."

The original idea had been to replicate the group's setlists of the mid-'60s when they had been known as Levon and the Hawks, playing clubs throughout Canada and the US. Of the ten tracks, only one, "Share Your Love (With Me)" had been performed by the group in the mid-'60s. The rest were merely tracks the group admired, two of them, "Holy Cow" and "A Change Is Gonna Come", chronologically coming after the group's club days.

Rhapsody praised the album, calling it one of its favorite cover albums. John Bauldie in Q Magazine called the re-issued album 'funny, affectionate and immaculately polished' in 1991.

Track listing

Side one

Side two

 Sides one and two were combined as tracks 1–10 on CD reissues.

2001 reissue bonus tracks

Personnel
The Band
Rick Danko – bass guitar, acoustic guitar, vocals
Levon Helm – drums, electric guitar, bass guitar, double bass, vocals
Garth Hudson – organ, piano, clavinet, synthesizer, saxophones
Richard Manuel – acoustic and electric piano, drums, vocals
Robbie Robertson – electric and acoustic guitars

Additional personnel
Billy Mundi – drums on "Ain't Got No Home" and "Promised Land"
Ben Keith – steel guitar on "Promised Land"
Technical
Mark Harman – engineer
Jay Ranellucci – engineer
John Wilson – engineer
Edward Kasper – artwork

References

1973 albums
The Band albums
Capitol Records albums
Covers albums
Albums produced by Garth Hudson
Albums produced by Levon Helm
Albums produced by Richard Manuel
Albums produced by Rick Danko
Albums produced by Robbie Robertson
Albums recorded at Capitol Studios